Daimon Dam is a gravity dam located in Yamanashi Prefecture in Japan. The dam is used for flood control, water supply and power production. The catchment area of the dam is 51.7 km2. The dam impounds about 19  ha of land when full and can store 3600 thousand cubic meters of water. The construction of the dam was started on 1968 and completed in 1987.

References

Dams in Yamanashi Prefecture
1987 establishments in Japan